Maximov or Maksimov or Maximoff is a Russian surname. Transliterated from Ukrainian, it may be rendered as Maksymov. The feminine forms are Maximova, Maksimova and Maksymova. The surname is derived from the male given name Maksim and literally means Maksim's. It may refer to:

 Aleksandr Maksimov (ethnographer) (1872–1941), Soviet ethnographer
 Aleksey Mikhailovich Maksimov (1813–1861), Russian stage actor
 Aleksey Aleksandrovich Maksimov (born 1952), Russian painter and enamellist
 Alexander A. Maximow (1874–1928), Russian scientist
 Alexandra Maksimova (born 1989), Belarusian ice dancer
 Dmitry Maksimov (judoka) (born 1978), Russian judoka
 Dmitry Maksimov (runner) (born 1977), Russian runner
 Ekaterina Maximova (1939–2009), Soviet and Russian ballerina
 Elena Maksimova (born 1988), Belarusian chess master
 Grigorii Maksimov (1893–1950), Russian anarcho-syndicalist
 Ilya Maksimov (born 1987), Russian footballer
 Ivan Maksimov (born 1995), Russian footballer
 Ivan Maximov (born 1958), Russian animator
 Larisa Maksimova (born 1943), Russian mathematical logician
 Matéo Maximoff (1917–1999), French writer
 Nikolai Maksimov (born 1956), Russian naval officer
 Nikolay Maksimov (born 1972), Russian water polo player
 Nikolai Alexandrovich Maximov (1880–1952), Soviet plant physiologist
 Nina Christesen (née Maximoff; 1911–2001), Russian-Australian academic
 Oleksandr Maksymov (born 1986), Ukrainian footballer
 Valentina Maksimova (born 1937), Russian track cyclist
 Vassily Maximov (1844–1911), 19th-century Russian painter
 Vladimir Maksimov (actor) (1880–1937), Russian actor
 Vladimir Maksimov (writer) (1930–1995), Soviet and Russian writer
 Vladimir Maksimov (born 1945), Soviet and Russian handball player and coach
 Yevgeny Maximov (1849–1904), Russian soldier and journalist

Fictional characters
 Demitri Maximoff, protagonist of the video game franchise Darkstalkers by Capcom
 Peter Maximoff, an X-Men film series superhero
 Pietro Maximoff, also known as Quicksilver, a Marvel Comics superhero
 Thomas Maximoff, also known as Tommy Shepherd or Speed, a Marvel Comics superhero
 Crystalia Amaquelin Maximoff, also known as Crystal, a Marvel Comics superhero and Quicksilver's ex-wife
 Luna Maximoff, a Marvel Comics superhero and daughter of Quicksilver and Crystal
 Wanda Maximoff, also known as the Scarlet Witch, a Marvel Comics superhero and mother of Wiccan and Speed
 William Maximoff, also known as Billy Kaplan-Altman or Wiccan, a Marvel Comics superhero

See also
 Maksimović
 Maksimenko

Russian-language surnames
Patronymic surnames
Surnames from given names